The Kerkennah Islands gerbil (Dipodillus zakariai) is a rodent from Kerkennah Islands, Tunisia.

References
Musser, G. G. and M. D. Carleton. 2005. Superfamily Muroidea. pp. 894–1531 in Mammal Species of the World a Taxonomic and Geographic Reference. D. E. Wilson and D. M. Reeder eds. Johns Hopkins University Press, Baltimore.

Dipodillus
Endemic fauna of Tunisia
Mammals described in 1976